The 33rd New York State Legislature, consisting of the New York State Senate and the New York State Assembly, met from January 30 to April 6, 1810, during the third year of Daniel D. Tompkins's governorship, in Albany.

Background
Under the provisions of the New York Constitution of 1777, amended by the Constitutional Convention of 1801, 32 Senators were elected on general tickets in the four senatorial districts for four-year terms. They were divided into four classes, and every year eight Senate seats came up for election. Assemblymen were elected countywide on general tickets to a one-year term, the whole Assembly being renewed annually.

In 1797, Albany was declared the State capital, and all subsequent Legislatures have been meeting there ever since. In 1799, the Legislature enacted that future Legislatures meet on the last Tuesday of January of each year unless called earlier by the governor.

In 1808, Cortland County was split from Onondaga County, and in 1809 was apportioned 1 seat in the Assembly, taken from Onondaga. In 1809, Schenectady County was split from Albany County, and was apportioned 2 seats in the Assembly, taken from Albany. Also in 1809, Sullivan County was split from Ulster County, but both remained in a joint Assembly district.

At this time the politicians were divided into two opposing political parties: the Federalists and the Democratic-Republicans.

At this time the major political controversy was the Embargo Act of 1807 which was supported by the Democratic-Republicans, but opposed by the Federalists. The Embargo was very unpopular and led to a revival of the Federalist Party which had been reduced to a small minority (without any member in the Senate from 1806 to 1808), but at the State election in April 1809 already won a majority of the Assembly seats.

Elections
The State election was held from April 25 to 27, 1809. Israel Carll (Southern D.), Johannes Bruyn, Samuel Haight (both Middle D.), Daniel Paris, John Stearns, (both Eastern D.), Amos Hall, Seth Phelps and Jonas Platt (all three Western D.) were elected to the Senate. Carll, Bruyn and Haight were Democratic-Republicans, the other five were Federalists.

Sessions
The Legislature met at the Old City Hall in Albany on January 30, 1810; and adjourned on April 6.

William North (Fed.) was elected Speaker with 59 votes against 45 for William Livingston (Dem.-Rep.). James Van Ingen (Fed.) was elected Clerk of the Assembly with 59 votes against 47 for the incumbent Daniel Rodman (Dem.-Rep.). The incumbent Thomas D. Donnelly (Dem.-Rep.) was re-elected Sergeant-at-Arms of the Assembly with 55 votes against 49 for Jacob C. Cuyler (Fed.).

On February 8, the Legislature elected Abraham G. Lansing (Fed.) to succeed David Thomas (Dem.-Rep.) as New York State Treasurer.

On March 13, 1810, State Senator Jonas Platt presented his project for a bipartisan Canal Commission to the State Legislature, and two days later the Legislature appointed Gouverneur Morris, Assemblyman Stephen Van Rensselaer, Speaker William North, Thomas Eddy (all four Fed.), State Senator DeWitt Clinton, Surveyor General Simeon DeWitt and Congressman Peter B. Porter (all three Dem.-Rep.) a "Commission to Explore a Route for a Canal to Lake Erie, and Report".

State Senate

Districts
The Southern District (5 seats) consisted of Kings, New York, Queens, Richmond, Suffolk and Westchester counties.
The Middle District (7 seats) consisted of Dutchess, Orange, Ulster, Columbia, Delaware, Rockland, Greene and Sullivan counties.
The Eastern District (8 seats) consisted of Washington, Clinton, Rensselaer, Albany, Saratoga, Essex, Montgomery, Franklin and Schenectady counties.
The Western District (12 seats) consisted of Herkimer, Ontario, Otsego, Tioga, Onondaga, Schoharie, Steuben, Chenango, Oneida, Cayuga, Genesee, Seneca, Jefferson, Lewis, St. Lawrence, Allegany, Broome, Madison, Niagara and Cortland counties.

Note: There are now 62 counties in the State of New York. The counties which are not mentioned in this list had not yet been established, or sufficiently organized, the area being included in one or more of the abovementioned counties.

Members
The asterisk (*) denotes members of the previous Legislature who continued in office as members of this Legislature.

Employees
Clerk: Sebastian Visscher

State Assembly

Districts

Albany County (4 seats)
Allegany and Steuben counties (1 seat)
Broome County (1 seat)
Cayuga County (3 seats)
Chenango County (3 seats)
Clinton and Franklin counties (1 seat)
Columbia County (4 seats)
Cortland County (1 seat)
Delaware County (2 seats)
Dutchess County (6 seats)
Essex County (1 seat)
Genesee County (1 seat)
Greene County (2 seats)
Herkimer County (3 seats)
Jefferson County (2 seats)
Kings County (1 seat)
Lewis County (1 seat)
Madison County (3 seats)
Montgomery County (5 seats)
The City and County of New York (11 seats)
Niagara County (1 seat)
Oneida County (5 seats)
Onondaga County (2 seats)
Ontario County (5 seats)
Orange County (4 seats)
Otsego County (4 seats)
Queens County (3 seats)
Rensselaer County (4 seats)
Richmond County (1 seat)
Rockland County (1 seat)
St. Lawrence County (1 seat)
Saratoga County (4 seats)
Schenectady County (2 seats)
Schoharie County (2 seats)
Seneca County (1 seat)
Suffolk County (3 seats)
Sullivan and Ulster counties (4 seats)
Tioga County (1 seat)
Washington County (5 seats)
Westchester County (3 seats)

Note: There are now 62 counties in the State of New York. The counties which are not mentioned in this list had not yet been established, or sufficiently organized, the area being included in one or more of the abovementioned counties.

Assemblymen
The asterisk (*) denotes members of the previous Legislature who continued as members of this Legislature. Nathaniel Locke changed from the Senate to the Assembly.

Employees
Clerk: James Van Ingen
Sergeant-at-Arms: Thomas Donnelly
Doorkeeper: Benjamin Whipple

Notes

Sources
The New York Civil List compiled by Franklin Benjamin Hough (Weed, Parsons and Co., 1858) [see pg. 108f for Senate districts; pg. 120f for senators; pg. 148f for Assembly districts; pg. 183f for assemblymen]
The History of Political Parties in the State of New-York, from the Ratification of the Federal Constitution to 1840 by Jabez D. Hammond (4th ed., Vol. 1, H. & E. Phinney, Cooperstown, 1846; pages 276-284)
Election result Assembly, Albany Co. at project "A New Nation Votes", compiled by Phil Lampi, hosted by Tufts University Digital Library
Election result Assembly, Allegany and Steuben Co. at project "A New Nation Votes"
Election result Assembly, Broome Co. at project "A New Nation Votes"
Election result Assembly, Chenango Co. at project "A New Nation Votes"
Election result Assembly, Columbia Co. at project "A New Nation Votes"
Election result Assembly, Delaware Co. at project "A New Nation Votes"
Election result Assembly, Dutchess Co. at project "A New Nation Votes"
Election result Assembly, Essex Co. at project "A New Nation Votes"
Election result Assembly, Genesee Co. at project "A New Nation Votes"
Election result Assembly, Greene Co. at project "A New Nation Votes"
Election result Assembly, Herkimer Co. at project "A New Nation Votes"
Election result Assembly, Jefferson Co. at project "A New Nation Votes"
Election result Assembly, Kings Co. at project "A New Nation Votes"
Election result Assembly, Madison Co. at project "A New Nation Votes"
Election result Assembly, Montgomery Co. at project "A New Nation Votes"
Election result Assembly, Onondaga Co. at project "A New Nation Votes"
Election result Assembly, Orange Co. at project "A New Nation Votes"
Election result Assembly, Queens Co. at project "A New Nation Votes"
Election result Assembly, Rensselaer Co. at project "A New Nation Votes"
Election result Assembly, Richmond Co. at project "A New Nation Votes"
Election result Assembly, Rockland Co. at project "A New Nation Votes"
Election result Assembly, St. Lawrence Co. at project "A New Nation Votes"
Election result Assembly, Schenectady Co. at project "A New Nation Votes"
Election result Assembly, Schoharie Co. at project "A New Nation Votes"
Election result Assembly, Seneca Co. at project "A New Nation Votes"
Election result Assembly, Suffolk Co. at project "A New Nation Votes" [gives wrong party affiliation for Scudder]
Election result Assembly, Sullivan and Ulster Co. at project "A New Nation Votes"
Election result Assembly, Washington Co. at project "A New Nation Votes"
Election result Assembly, Westchester Co. at project "A New Nation Votes"
Election result Senate, Southern D. at project "A New Nation Votes"
Election result Senate, Middle D. at project "A New Nation Votes"
Election result Senate, Eastern D. at project "A New Nation Votes"
Election result Senate, Western D. at project "A New Nation Votes"
Election result, Assembly Speaker at project "A New Nation Votes"
Election result, Assembly Clerk at project "A New Nation Votes"
Election result, Assembly Sergeant-at-Arms at project "A New Nation Votes"

033
1809 in New York (state)
1810 in New York (state)
1809 U.S. legislative sessions